Vice-Admiral John Sheridan (c.1778 – 15 May 1862) was an officer of the Royal Navy who saw service in most of the major conflicts of the early nineteenth century, including the French Revolutionary and Napoleonic Wars, the Anglo-Russian War and the War of 1812.

Sheridan had risen to lieutenant by the end of the French Revolutionary Wars, and with the resumption of hostilities in 1803 was serving in the English Channel. Here he acquitted himself well in several actions, after which he moved to the Baltic and was active in several engagements against the Russians during the Anglo-Russian War. Promoted to commander as a result, he took the bomb vessel  to North America and was present at the assault on Fort McHenry during the Battle of Baltimore, actions which inspired the writing of the poem that became the words to "The Star-Spangled Banner". Promoted to post-captain towards the end of the Napoleonic Wars he retired ashore, and died in 1862 with the rank of vice-admiral.

Career
Sheridan was born c. 1778 and entered the navy in 1795, shortly after the outbreak of the French Revolutionary Wars. He rose quickly through the ranks, was promoted to lieutenant on 21 December 1801 and by 1803 was senior lieutenant aboard , which was then serving in the English Channel under Commander Edward Pelham Brenton. On 27 October 1803 Merlin and the schooner  captured the 2-gun privateer Sept Frères, after which Sheridan saw action at the bombardments of Le Havre on 23 July and 1 August 1804. Sheridan then took part in the burning of the wreck of the frigate  near Barfleur on 10 December 1804, the Shannon having run aground under French shore batteries while sailing in company with Merlin. Sheridan went on to be active during the war with Russia which broke out in 1807, serving aboard . He was present at the capture of three Russian ships off the coast of Finland, and at the attack on several Russian gunboats at Percola Point. Seven of the eight gunboats were captured, and 12 craft containing stores for the army were also taken. For his actions during the engagement Sheridan was promoted to commander.

Sheridan was given command of the newly built bomb vessel , and commissioned her on 7 October 1813. They commenced firing at daylight, but could not inflict much damage, and after making a probing assault by boat, the British withdrew. The assault was witnessed by Francis Scott Key, who was inspired to write a poem describing the events, which later became the words to the United States' national anthem, "The Star-Spangled Banner". Sheridan later served off the coast of Georgia, being promoted to post-captain in June 1815 towards the conclusion of the Napoleonic Wars, and being succeeded in the command of Terror that month by Constantine Richard Moorsom.

He did not serve again at sea following the end of the wars, though he continued to rise through the ranks according to his seniority. He had reached the rank of vice-admiral (promoted in retirement in 1858) by the time of his death, on 15 May 1862 at Skisdon Lodge, Cornwall, at the age of 84.

Notes

References

1770s births
1862 deaths
Royal Navy vice admirals
Royal Navy personnel of the French Revolutionary Wars
Royal Navy personnel of the Napoleonic Wars
Royal Navy personnel of the War of 1812